Michael Hout (born May 14, 1950) is a Professor of Sociology at New York University. His contributions to sociology include using demographic methods to study social change in inequality, religion, and politics. His current work used the General Social Survey (GSS) to estimate the social standing of occupations introduced into the census classification since 1990. He digitized all occupational information in the GSS (1972–2014) and coded it all to the 2010 standard. Other recent projects used the GSS panel to study Americans' changing perceptions of class, religion, and happiness. In 2006, Mike and Claude Fischer published Century of Difference, a book on twentieth-century social and cultural trends in the United States. Other books include Truth about Conservative Christians with Andrew Greeley, Following in Father's Footsteps: Social Mobility in Ireland, and Inequality by Design

Education
Michael Hout received a BA in Sociology and History from the University of Pittsburgh in 1972, and an MA in 1973 and a PhD in Sociology in 1976 from Indiana University.

Work 
He has served as a professor at the University of Arizona, University of California-Berkeley, and New York University.

Awards
Michael Hout's honors include election to the American Academy of Arts & Sciences in 1997, the National Academy of Sciences in 2003, and the American Philosophical Society in 2006. He received the Otis Dudley Duncan Award for Century of Difference from the American Sociological Association's section on Population in 2007, and the Clifford C. Clogg Memorial Award given by the Population Association of America in 1996.

Research 
Inequality by Design argued that the hyper-individualism of inequality studies like The Bell Curve captured some significant aspects of the rank of individuals but could never account for the rapidly growing inequality of jobs, wages, and family outcomes, and life chances. It expanded on work Michael Hout completed on the interaction between socioeconomic background and higher education in social mobility in the United States and Europe. A different line of work on the demography of American religion and religious institutions documented the role of birth rates in the rise of Evangelical churches and the decline of Mainline ones. With Claude S. Fischer, Hout has documented American's declining religious affiliation since 1990 and developed an explanation rooted in generational turnover and political polarization. He has used similar models to explain ethic attachments and class voting patterns.

References

1950 births
Living people
American sociologists
New York University faculty
University of Pittsburgh alumni
Indiana University alumni
Members of the American Philosophical Society